Saint-Côme-du-Mont is a former commune in the Manche department in Normandy in north-western France. On 1 January 2016, it was merged into the new commune of Carentan-les-Marais.

Gallery

See also
Communes of the Manche department
Brothers in Arms: Road to Hill 30, video game based on the true story of the 502nd Parachute Infantry Regiment of the famed 101st Airborne Division

References

Saintcomedumont